Sam Simmons may refer to:
 Sam Simmons (American football) (born 1979), former NFL and AFL wide receiver
 Sam Simmons (comedian) (born 1977), Australian comedian
Sam Simmonds may refer to:
Sam Simmonds (film editor), British film editor
Sam Simmonds (rugby union) (born 1994), English rugby union player

See also
Samuel Simmons (1640–1687), English printer
Samuel Foart Simmons (1750–1813), British physician

Sam Simmons, Houston Teen musicians artist